The name Celia has been used for three tropical cyclones in the Atlantic Ocean and for eight in the Eastern Pacific Ocean. It has also been used for one extratropical European windstorm.

In the Atlantic:
Tropical Storm Celia (1962), did not affect land
Hurricane Celia (1966), struck the Bahamas
Hurricane Celia (1970), Category 4 hurricane that made landfall in western Pinar del Río Province, Cuba and at Corpus Christi, Texas; caused 28 deaths and $930 million (1970 USD) in damage
The name was retired in the Atlantic basin following the 1970 season.

In the Eastern Pacific:
Hurricane Celia (1980), remained well offshore of Mexico
Hurricane Celia (1986), remained well offshore of Mexico
Hurricane Celia (1992), Category 4 storm that stayed well at sea
Tropical Storm Celia (1998), stayed well off the coast of Mexico
Hurricane Celia (2004), stayed out to sea
Hurricane Celia (2010), Category 5 hurricane that remained offshore Mexico
Hurricane Celia (2016), churned in the open ocean, dissipated well east of Hawaii
Tropical Storm Celia (2022), formed off the coast of Central America and paralleled the southwestern coast of Mexico before moving out to sea

In Europe:
Storm Celia (2022), impacted the Iberian Peninsula and Morocco; deposited an accumulation of Saharan dust in parts of Spain.

Atlantic hurricane set index articles
Pacific hurricane set index articles